Nzinda or Nzida is a commune and a town in the city of Kikwit in the Democratic Republic of Congo.

References 

Kikwit
Communes of the Democratic Republic of the Congo